Ali Abdul Mughni (1935– 8 October 1962) was a Yemeni military officer and revolutionary. He was one of principal leaders of the Yemeni revolution of 1962 that toppled the Mutawakkilite Kingdom of Yemen, leading to the establishment of the Yemen Arab Republic. He has been known as "the Architect of the 1962 Revolution.

Biography 
Abdul Mughni was born in 1935 in Al-Masqah village, Al Saddah District, Ibb Governorate. In 1948 he moved to Sana'a to continue his basic education at Al-Aytam school, and n 1958 he joined the Yemeni Military Academy. He participated in establishing and leading Free Officers Organization, a group of army officers, that played a key role in the revolution with a coup d'état to depose Imam Ahmad bin Yahya and announced the 26 September Revolution on Radio Sanaa, declaring the Yemen Arab Republic in 1962. Ali led a military campaign against the royalists led by Hassan ibn Yahya in Marib and was killed in Sirwah on 8 October 1962.

References 

1935 births
20th-century Yemeni military personnel
People from Ibb Governorate
1962 deaths
Yemeni Military Academy alumni
Free Officers Organization (Yemen)
Yemeni revolutionaries
People of the North Yemen Civil War